Ruslan Mykhaylovych Bidnenko (born 20 July 1981 in Boryspil Raion) is a retired professional Ukrainian footballer who currently plays for Uzbek League side FK Dinamo Samarqand. He has played once for the Ukraine national football team. He mainly plays as a midfielder.

Career

Club career
Bidnenko started his career with hometown club FC Borysfen Boryspil in 1997 and played over 160 games before a transfer to Dynamo Kyiv in 2003. Restricted to only twelve appearances in one and a half seasons, he joined FC Dnipro Dnipropetrovsk in 2004. After making 18 appearances due to injuries he was sent on loan to FC Naftovyk Okhtyrka until the end of the 2007–08 season. In 2009, he was loaned to Arsenal Kyiv. On 17 October 2009, he signed a deal with FC Chornomorets Odesa until the end of the 2009–10 season. He has been a Ukrainian Premier League champion in 2003–04, and a runner-up and Ukrainian Cup winner in 2004–05.

International career
He has appeared only in one game for the senior team when in away friendly against France in Saint Denis at Stade de France Bidenko came out on substitution for Mykhailo Starostyak.

Honours 
 Ukrainian Premier League champion: 2003–04
 Ukrainian Premier League third: 2004–05
 Ukrainian Cup champion: 2004–05

References

1981 births
Living people
Ukrainian footballers
FC Dnipro players
FC Dynamo Kyiv players
FC Borysfen Boryspil players
FC Borysfen-2 Boryspil players
FC Chornomorets Odesa players
FC Naftovyk-Ukrnafta Okhtyrka players
FC Vostok players
FC Poltava players
Ukraine international footballers
Ukrainian Premier League players
Ukrainian expatriate footballers
Expatriate footballers in Kazakhstan
Ukrainian expatriate sportspeople in Kazakhstan
Ukrainian football managers
Association football midfielders
Sportspeople from Kyiv Oblast